"Nineteen Hundred and Nineteen" is a poem by W. B. Yeats. It was included in his collection The Tower in 1928.

References 

1928 poems
Poetry by W. B. Yeats